George Michael Volkoff,  (February 23, 1914 – April 24, 2000) was a Russian-Canadian physicist and academic who helped, with J. Robert Oppenheimer, predict the existence of neutron stars before they were discovered.

Early life
He was born in Moscow. His father was a Russian engineer who emigrated to Vancouver, British Columbia, Canada in 1924. Unable to find work, his father moved the family to Harbin, Manchuria in 1927. His mother died soon after moving to Harbin. In 1936, Volkoff's father returned to Russia but was exiled to the arctic camps as part of the Great Purge where he would die.

Education
Volkoff returned to Vancouver and entered the University of British Columbia where he received a Bachelor of Arts in physics in 1934 and a Master of Arts degree in 1936. He then studied with J. Robert Oppenheimer at the University of California, Berkeley where he published his paper "On Massive Neutron Cores" and earned his Ph.D. in 1940.

Academic
In 1940, he joined the physics department of the University of British Columbia as an assistant professor. During World War II he worked on the Manhattan Project at the Montreal Laboratory. From 1961 to 1970, he was the head of the department. From 1970 to 1979, he was the Dean of Science. He was a member of the University of British Columbia Senate for three periods: 1950 to 1954, 1961 to 1963, and 1969 to 1979.

He was the president of the Canadian Association of Physicists from 1962 to 1963.

Honours
In 1946, he was made a member of the Order of the British Empire. In 1994, he was made an Officer of the Order of Canada for having "contributed to the general development of physics in Canada and, in particular, at the University of British Columbia".

He died in Vancouver in 2000.

See also
 Tolman–Oppenheimer–Volkoff limit
 Tolman–Oppenheimer–Volkoff equation

References

1914 births
2000 deaths
Canadian physicists
Canadian university and college faculty deans
Fellows of the Royal Society of Canada
Canadian Members of the Order of the British Empire
Officers of the Order of Canada
Canadian people of Russian descent
Soviet emigrants to Canada
University of British Columbia alumni
Academic staff of the University of British Columbia
University of California, Berkeley alumni
Scientists from Moscow
Manhattan Project people
Presidents of the Canadian Association of Physicists
Fellows of the American Physical Society